Baton Rouge shooting may refer to:

Shooting of Alton Sterling, the fatal shooting of an African American man on July 5, 2016
2016 shooting of Baton Rouge police officers, in which three officers were killed and three others injured on July 17, 2016